The Griboyedov Prize was a Russian literary award established in 1878 by the Society of Russian Dramatists and Opera Composers to honor Alexander Griboyedov. The opening ceremony was held on 11 February (old style: 30 January), on the anniversary of the great Russian playwright's death. The prize, collected through private donations, was awarded to the best play of the year, produced in Saint Petersburg and Moscow by either Imperial Theatres or their private counterparts. Despite  the fact that the Prize was launched in 1878, it was first awarded in 1883.

Laureates
 1882/1883 — Alexander Ostrovsky, The Handsome Man
 1883/1884 — Nikolai Chayev, The Tsar and the Grand Prince of Rus Vasily Ivanovich Shuysky
 1884/1885 — Alexander Ostrovsky, Not of This World
 1885/1886 — Pyotr Nevezhin, Childhood Friend
 1886/1887 — Vladimir Tikhonov, The Ace
 1887/1888 — Pyotr Nevezhin, Second Youth
 1888/1889 — Dmitry Averkiyev, Teophano
 1889/1890 — Pyotr Gnedich, The Rolling Stone
 1890/1891 — Vladimir Nemirovich-Danchenko, The New Business
 1891/1892 — Leo Tolstoy, The Fruits of Enlightenment
 1893/1894 — joint winners: Modest Chaykosky, Prejudices; Evgeny Goslavsky, Price to Pay; Vasily Velichko, First Fly
 1894/1895 — Modest Chaykosky, Fear of Life; Alexander Yuzhin, Old School
 1896/1897 — Vladimir Nemirovich-Danchenko, Price of Life
 1897/1898 — Modest Chaykovsky, Wrestlers; Alexander Yuzhin, The Gentlemen
 1898/1899 — Ippolit Shpazhinsky, Two Fates
 1900/1901 — Anton Chekhov, The Three Sisters
 1901/1902 — joint winners: Maxim Gorky, The Philistines; Sergey Naydyonov, Vanyushin's Children and Vladimir Nemirovich-Danchenko, In Dreams
 1902/1903 — Maxim Gorky, The Lower Depths
 1903/1904 — Anton Chekhov, The Cherry Orchard
 1906/1907 — Leonid Andreyev, The Life of Man
 1909/1910 — Evtikhy Karpov, Brilliant Personality; Evgeny Chirikov, King of Nature
 1911/1912 — Tatiana Shchepkina-Kupernik, Happy Woman
 1912/1913 — Pyotr Gnedich, The Assembly;  Sergey Naydyonov, Aunt Anya's Love Affair
 1913/1914 — A. Alpatin, The Last Bet; Vladimir Volkenstein, The Wanderers
 1914/1915 — N.A. Grigoriev-Istomin, The Kedrov Sisters; Nikolai Shklyar, The Tale of Bonny Prince Albert, Alexey N. Tolstoy, Kasatka
 1915/1916 – Vladimir Vinnichenko, The Lie; Sergey Naydyonov, The Woman Worker

References

Awards established in 1878
Russian literary awards
Russian-language literary awards